Kaiser is an unincorporated community in Miller County in the U.S. state of Missouri. It is located on a county road just south of Route 42/134.  The zip code is 65047.

A post office called Kaiser has been in operation since 1904. The community was named after the local Kaiser family. With America's entry into World War I and the anti-German hysteria that followed, some residents proposed changing the name of the community to Success. However, after some debate, the plan failed.

References

Unincorporated communities in Miller County, Missouri
Unincorporated communities in Missouri